Marcus Laborne Mattioli (born 18 October 1960 in Belo Horizonte) is a former international freestyle and butterfly swimmer from Brazil, who participated in the 1980 Summer Olympics for his native country. There he won the bronze medal in the men's 4×200-metre freestyle relay event at the 1980 Summer Olympics, alongside Jorge Fernandes, Cyro Delgado, and Djan Madruga.

Participated at the 1978 World Aquatics Championships in West Berlin, where he finished 34th in the 100-metre freestyle, and 29th in the 200-metre freestyle.

He was at the 1979 Pan American Games, in San Juan. He won a silver medal in the 4×200-metre freestyle, and a bronze medal in the 4×100-metre freestyle. He also finished 7th in the 200-metre freestyle, and 13th in the 100-metre freestyle. He broke the South American record of the 4×200-metre freestyle.

Mattioli won the bronze medal in the men's 4×200-metre freestyle relay event at the 1980 Summer Olympics, alongside Jorge Fernandes, Cyro Delgado, and Djan Madruga, with a time of 7:29.30. He also swam the 100-metre butterfly, 200-metre butterfly and 200-metre freestyle, not going to the final.

At the 1981 Summer Universiade, held in Bucharest, Mattioli won two bronze medals in the 4×100-metre freestyle and 4×100-metre medley relays.

Participated at the 1986 World Aquatics Championships in Madrid, where he finished 29th in the 200-metre butterfly, and 39th in the 100-metre butterfly.

Mattioli still swim, now breaking world records in the Masters category.

References

External links 
 
 
 

1960 births
Living people
Brazilian male butterfly swimmers
Swimmers at the 1979 Pan American Games
Swimmers at the 1980 Summer Olympics
Olympic swimmers of Brazil
Olympic bronze medalists for Brazil
Olympic bronze medalists in swimming
Brazilian male freestyle swimmers
Medalists at the 1980 Summer Olympics
Pan American Games silver medalists for Brazil
Pan American Games bronze medalists for Brazil
Pan American Games medalists in swimming
Universiade medalists in swimming
Universiade bronze medalists for Brazil
Medalists at the 1981 Summer Universiade
Medalists at the 1979 Pan American Games
Sportspeople from Belo Horizonte
20th-century Brazilian people